Rocky Fork is a stream in Ray County in the U.S. state of Missouri. It is a tributary of the Crooked River.

Rocky Fork was so named on account of the rocky character of the stream.

See also
List of rivers of Missouri

References

Rivers of Ray County, Missouri
Rivers of Missouri